Fae Searcy was an American politician who served as clerk of the Supreme Court of Illinois. She was the first woman to hold a statewide elected office in the state of Illinois.

Biography
Searcy was born in Shelby County, Illinois as Fae Isenberg. She attended public school in Shelbyville.

Searcy attended Oberlin College, and graduated from the Hinshaw Conservatory of Music in Chicago.

She married Earle Benjamin Searcy in 1917, taking his surname. The Searcy's would be parents to daughter Barbara Jane Searcy Damewood and son Earle B. Searcy.

Searcy's husband became a politician. She joined he frequently on campaign trips, and was involved in Republican Party women's clubs.

Clerk of the Supreme Court of Illinois
In 1955, Searcy's husband, serving in the statewide elected office of Clerk of the Illinois Supreme Court, died in office of a heart attack. On April 13, 1955, in an instance of widow's succession, she was appointed by the court to fill the vacant office, becoming the first woman to fill a statewide elected office in Illinois. She won election as a Republican to a full term in 1956. Searcy was reelected to an additional full term in 1962.

Death
On March 23, 1968, Searcy died at the age of 75, after having ailed from a lingering illness. Searcy still placed second out of three candidates in the June 1968 Republican primary election for the office of Clerk of the Illinois Supreme Court, which she had already filed to appear on the ballot fore prior to her death.

References

Year of birth missing
1968 deaths
People from Shelby County, Illinois
Illinois Republicans
20th-century American women politicians
20th-century American politicians